The Verity mine is a large mine located about '30 miles kilometres north-northeast of Blue River in southeastern  British Columbia', Canada. Verity represents one of the largest tantalum reserves in Canada having estimated reserves of 3.06 million tonnes of ore grading 0.02% tantalum, 0.065% niobium and 3.2% fluorite.

References 

Tantalum mines in Canada